Tooele Valley Airport , also known as Bolinder Field, is a public use airport in Erda, Tooele County, Utah, United States. It is owned by the Salt Lake City Department of Airports and is located five nautical miles (9.26 km) northwest of the central business district of the City of Tooele.  According to the FAA's National Plan of Integrated Airport Systems for 2009–2013, it is categorized as a general aviation airport.

Although most U.S. airports use the same three-letter location identifier for the FAA and IATA, this airport is assigned TVY by the FAA but has no designation from the IATA (which assigned TVY to Dawei Airport in Dawei, Myanmar).

Facilities and aircraft 
It has one runway designated 17/35 with an asphalt surface measuring 6,100 by 100 feet (1,859 x 30 m).

For the 12-month period ending May 11, 2008, the airport had 44,125 aircraft operations, an average of 121 per day: 99% general aviation, 1% air taxi and a few ultralights. At that time there were 20 aircraft based at this airport: 90% single-engine, 5% multi-engine and 5% ultralights.

References

External links 
 Aerial photo as of 1 October 1997 from USGS The National Map
 
 

Airports in Utah
Buildings and structures in Tooele County, Utah
Transportation in Tooele County, Utah